UFC Fight Night: Vieira vs. Tate (also known as UFC on ESPN+ 56, UFC Vegas 43 and UFC Fight Night 198) was a mixed martial arts event produced by the Ultimate Fighting Championship that took place on November 20, 2021 at the UFC Apex facility in Enterprise, Nevada, part of the Las Vegas Metropolitan Area, United States.

Background
A women's bantamweight bout between Ketlen Vieira and former Strikeforce and UFC Women's Bantamweight Champion Miesha Tate headlined the event. The pairing was originally expected to take place at UFC Fight Night: Ladd vs. Dumont, but it was pulled from the card when Tate tested positive for COVID-19.

A bantamweight bout between Rani Yahya and Kyung Ho Kang took place at this event. They were originally scheduled to meet at UFC on ESPN: Hall vs. Strickland, but Yahya tested positive for COVID-19 and the pairing was postponed.

A women's flyweight bout between Joanne Wood and Alexa Grasso was scheduled for the event. However, Grasso was forced to pull out from the event due to injury and was replaced by Taila Santos.

A featherweight bout between Gavin Tucker and Pat Sabatini was scheduled for the event. However, Tucker had to pull out of the bout in late October and was replaced by Tucker Lutz.

A women's strawweight bout between former Invicta FC Atomweight Champion and UFC Women's Strawweight Championship challenger Jessica Penne and Luana Pinheiro was expected to take place at the event. However, Penne withdrew from the bout due to undisclosed reasons and was replaced by Sam Hughes.

A women's strawweight bout between Loma Lookboonmee and Cheyanne Buys was scheduled for the event. However, Buys withdrew from the bout due to undisclosed reasons and was replaced by Lupita Godinez.

A flyweight bout between Malcolm Gordon and Denys Bondar was scheduled for this event. However, Gordon withdrew from the event due to undisclosed reason and the pairing was rescheduled for UFC Fight Night 201.

A light heavyweight bout between Marcin Prachnio and Azamat Murzakanov was scheduled for this event. However, due to visa issues, the bout was scrapped.

A heavyweight bout between Augusto Sakai and Tai Tuivasa was scheduled for this event. However, the pairing was scrapped due to visa issues and it is now expected to take place at UFC 269.

A lightweight bout between Farès Ziam and Terrance McKinney was scheduled for this event. However, it was scrapped a few hours before taking place due to one of McKinney's cornermen testing positive for COVID-19.

Results

Bonus awards
The following fighters received $50,000 bonuses.
 Fight of the Night: Adrian Yanez vs. Davey Grant 
 Performance of the Night: Taila Santos

See also 

 List of UFC events
 List of current UFC fighters
 2021 in UFC

References 

UFC Fight Night
2021 in mixed martial arts
November 2021 sports events in the United States
2021 in sports in Nevada
Mixed martial arts in Las Vegas
Sports competitions in Las Vegas